John Turner (born February 22, 1956, in Miami, Florida) is a former professional American football player.

Turner graduated from the University of Miami, where he starred as a cornerback. He played 10 seasons in the National Football League, 9 of those with the Minnesota Vikings. In 1997, Turner was hired to coach the expansion St. Paul Sting, a semi-pro American Football team in the Mid-America Football League (MFL). In the team's first and only season, Turner led the Sting to the MFL Championship Game, played at the Hubert H. Humphrey Metrodome in Minneapolis, Minnesota. The St. Paul Sting fell to the Minneapolis Lumberjacks in that Championship Game. The Lumberjacks were coached by former St. John's University standout Todd Fultz.  Turner played high school football at Miami Norland where the school mascot, like his professional years with Minnesota, was the Vikings.

Turner  currently works as an administrative assistant at Park Center Senior High School in Brooklyn Park, Minnesota.

References

1956 births
Living people
American football cornerbacks
Miami Hurricanes football players
Minnesota Vikings players
San Diego Chargers players
Players of American football from Miami
Miami Norland Senior High School alumni
National Football League replacement players